Events from the year 1920 in art.

Events
 February 1 – The National Art Gallery of Georgia opens in Tbilisi.
 March 17 – The Edith Cavell Memorial, by George Frampton, is unveiled in London.
 March 27 – Society of Wood Engravers founded in the United Kingdom.
 June 30–August 25 – The first Dadaist Fair is held in Berlin (Tempelhof). The Cologne group is formed by Jean Arp, Max Ernst and Alfred Grünwald.
 August 5 – Publication of the 'Realistic Manifesto', a Constructivist text, by Naum Gabo with his brother Anton Pevsner in Moscow.
 November 7 – The "mass action" The Storming of the Winter Palace, directed by Nikolai Evreinov, is staged outside the Winter Palace in Petrograd.
unknown dates
 Katherine Dreier, Man Ray and Marcel Duchamp form Société Anonyme.
 Bernard Leach and Shoji Hamada set up the Leach Pottery in St Ives, Cornwall.
 The Heckscher Museum of Art is established in Huntington, New York.
 The Latvian Museum of Foreign Art is established in Riga.
 Droit de suite is introduced in France.

Works

 Hans Baluschek – City of Workers
 Cecilia Beaux – portrait of Georges Clemenceau
 Thomas Hart Benton – People of Chilmark (figure composition)
 Pierre Bonnard – Landscape in Normandy
 Alexander Stirling Calder – Swann Memorial Fountain (Philadelphia)
 Sydney Carline – The Destruction of the Turkish Transport in the Gorge of the Wadi Fara, Palestine
 Lovis Corinth – Flowers and Wilhelmine
 Otto Dix
 The Card Players (Kartenspieler)
 The Match Vendor I
 Max Ernst
 The Hat Makes the Man (collage and gouache)
 Murdering Airplane (collage)
 James Earle Fraser – Frederick Keep Monument (Washington, D.C.)
 Daniel Chester French
 Abraham Lincoln (statue in Lincoln Memorial, Washington, D.C.)
 Dupont Circle Fountain (Washington, D.C.)
 Wisconsin (statue on Wisconsin State Capitol)
 J. W. Godward – A Red, Red Rose
 George Grosz – Republican Automatons
 Richard Jack – The Passing of the Chieftain
 Goscombe John – Equestrian statue of the Viscount Wolseley (London)
 Einar Jónsson – Thorfinn Karlsefni (bronze statue, Philadelphia)
 Eric Kennington – The Victims (retitled The Conquerors)
 Winifred Knights – The Deluge
 Boris Kustodiev
 Blue House
 The Bolshevik
 Portrait of Isaak Brodsky
 Trinity Day
 George Washington Lambert – A sergeant of the Light Horse
 Edwin Lutyens
 The Cenotaph, Whitehall, London (stone version)
 with Alfred Munnings (sculptor) – Equestrian statue of Edward Horner, St Andrew's Church, Mells, Somerset, England
 Paul Klee – Angelus Novus (worked copper plate)
 Stanton Macdonald-Wright – Airplane Synchromy in Yellow-Orange
 Henri Matisse – Interior at Nice
 Christopher R. W. Nevinson – The Soul of the Soulless City (originally New York – an Abstraction)
 William Nicholson
 Gertrude Jekyll
 Miss Jekyll's Gardening Boots
 Kuzma Petrov-Vodkin – 1918 in Petrograd (Petrograd Madonna)
 Victor Rousseau – Bronze figure group for Anglo-Belgian Memorial, London
 Charles Marie Louis Joseph Sarrabezolles – L'Âme de la France (plaster version)
 Georg Scholz – Industrial Farmers (Von der Heydt Museum, Wuppertal)
 Charles Sheeler – Church Street El
 Mario Sironi – Truck
 Stanley Spencer
 The Last Supper
 Christ Carrying the Cross
 Lorado Taft – Fountain of Time (Chicago)
 Aston Webb (architect) and Alfred Drury (sculptor) – London Troops War Memorial

Publications
 Daniel-Henry Kahnweiler – Der Weg zum Kubismus ("The Rise of Cubism").

Births

January to June
 January 12 – Bill Reid, Canadian artist (d. 1998).
 January 17 – Georges Pichard, French comics artist (d. 2003).
 January 30 – Patrick Heron, English painter, writer and designer (d. 1999).
 February 22 – Rocco Borella, Italian painter (d. 1994).
 March 3 – Ronald Searle, English cartoonist (d. 2011).
 March 14 – Hank Ketcham, American cartoonist (d. 2001).
 March 19 – Kjell Aukrust, Norwegian poet and artist (d. 2002)
 March 27 – Robin Jacques, English illustrator (d. 1995).
 April 8 – Hans Coper, German-born studio potter (d. 1981).
 April 24 – Paul Wonner, American painter (d. 2008).
 April 26 – Maynard Reece, American painter (d. 2020)
 May – Hans Josephsohn, German-born sculptor (d. 2012).
 May 8
 Saul Bass, American graphic designer and filmmaker (d. 1996).
 Tom of Finland, Finnish fetish artist (d. 1991).
 May 10 - Erna Viitol, Estonian sculptor (d. 2001).
 June 4 – Alejandro Obregón, Colombian painter, muralist, sculptor and engraver (d. 1992).
 June 24
 John Coplans, British-born painter and photographer (d. 2003)
 Jimmy Ernst, German-born American painter (d. 1984).
 June 29 – Ray Harryhausen, American-born stop-motion animator, sculptor (d. 2013).

July to December
 July 20 – Arthur Boyd, Australian painter and sculptor (d. 1999).
 July 21 – Constant Nieuwenhuys, Dutch painter, one of the innovators of Unitary Urbanism (d. 2005).
 August 1 – Ken Bald, American comic book artist and illustrator (d. 2019)
 August 5 – George Tooker, American figurative painter (d. 2011).
 August 9 – Gerda Schmidt-Panknin, German painter (d. 2021) 
 August 15 – Judy Cassab, born Judit Kaszab, Austrian-born Australian portrait painter (d. 2015).
 August 22 – Gene Davis, American painter (d. 1985).
 August 26
 Mauri Favén, Finnish painter (d. 2006).
 Brant Parker, American cartoonist (d. 2007).
 August 30 – Leonid Shvartsman, Soviet and Russian animator and artist (d. 2022).
 October 13 – Elaine Hamilton, American painter (d. 2010).
 October 31 – Helmut Newton, German-born photographer (d. 2004).
 November 23 – Wayne Thiebaud, American painter.
 November 30 – Walter Chandoha, American cat photographer (d. 2019).
December 14 – Claire Fejes, American artist
 December 18 – Enrique Grau, Colombian painter and sculptor (d. 2004).
 December 21 – Bob Bindig, American illustrator (d. 2007)

Full date unknown
 Adrian Heath, Burmese-born English painter (d. 1992).
 Raymond Moore, English landscape photographer (d. 1987).
 Daniel O'Neill, Irish painter (d. 1974).

Deaths
 January 24 – Amedeo Modigliani, Italian-born painter and sculptor (b. 1884)
 January 26 – Jeanne Hébuterne, French artist, Modigliani's mistress and model (suicide) (b. 1898)
 March 3 – Theodor Philipsen, Danish painter (b. 1840)
 March 13 – Mary Devens, American pictorial photographer (b. 1857)
 March 15 – Edith Holden, English nature artist and art teacher (b. 1871)
 March 26 – Samuel Colman, American painter and designer (b. 1832)
 April 20 – Briton Rivière, British painter (b. 1840)
 April 27 – Jacob Ungerer, German sculptor (b. 1840)
 May 7 – Hugh Thomson, British illustrator (b. 1860)
 May 12 – Georges Petit, French art dealer (b. 1856)
 July 5 – Max Klinger, German painter and sculptor (b. 1857)
 July 14 – Albert von Keller, German painter (b. 1844)
 July 17 – Sir Edmund Elton, 8th Baronet, English studio potter (b. 1846)
 August 4 – C. G. Finch-Davies, British bird painter (b. 1875)
 August 6 – Edward Francis Searles, American interior designer (b. 1841)
 August 12 – Walter W. Winans, American sculptor, painter, marksman and horse-breeder (b. 1852)
 August 22 – Anders Zorn, Swedish portrait painter (b. 1860)
 September 24 – Peter Carl Fabergé, Russian-born jeweller (b. 1846)
 November 13 – Luc-Olivier Merson, French painter (b. 1846)
 date unknown – Edith Corbet, Australian-born British landscape painter (b. 1846)

References

 
Years of the 20th century in art
1920s in art